The Iglesia de Nuestra Señora de los Dolores de Dalcahue (in English, Church of Our Lady of Sorrows, or Church of Our Lady of Dolours of Dalcahue) is a Catholic church located in the Plaza de Armas of the town of Dalcahue, on Chiloé Island, Chile.

The Church of Our Lady of Sorrows was declared a National Monument of Chile in 1971 and is one of the 16 Churches of Chiloé that were declared UNESCO World Heritage Sites on 30 November 2000.

It was built at the end of the 19th century in a site formerly occupied by a Jesuit missionary chapel.

This church leads one of the 24 parishes that form the Diocese of Ancud.

References 

Wooden churches in Chile
Churches in Chiloé Archipelago
World Heritage Sites in Chile
Roman Catholic churches in Chile
Colonial architecture in Chile